Erken-Shakhar (Erkin-Şaxar) is a rural locality (a settlement) and the administrative center of Nogaysky District of the Karachay-Cherkess Republic, Russia. Population:

References

Notes

Sources

Rural localities in Karachay-Cherkessia